"Bellacoso" is a single by Puerto Rican rappers Residente and Bad Bunny released on July 25, 2019, which will be included in Residente's upcoming second studio album by Sony Music Latin.

It peaked at number 35 in the Argentina Hot 100 chart, 24 in the US Hot Latin Songs and 61 in Spain.

Background and development 
In the context of the Puerto Rican protests, on July 15, Residente stated he would create a perreo song if the then Governor of Puerto Rico Ricardo Rosselló resigns. On July 24, Rosselló made public his resignation, and the next day Residente gave hints of the release of the promised song, which was released as a single on July 26 with the title "Bellacoso".

Residente stated that the song was inspired by an electroencephalogram test on Bad Bunny’s brain: "The brain frequencies, you change them into numbers, [...] then you can change those numbers into sounds, rhythms and patterns."

Music and lyrics 
Musically, "Bellacoso" is a reggaeton song, written by René Pérez Joglar, Benito Ocasio, Trooko, Jesús Molina, José Carlos Cruz, Luis Romero and Urbani Mota. Its production was handled by Residente and Trooko. The song runs 4 minutes and 17 seconds.

The drum sample was inspired by Daddy Yankee sound and it was provided by DJ Urba, who worked with Yankee previously. This is the second reggaeton song recorded by Residente, the first being 2005 Calle 13's song "Atrévete-te-te". "Bellacoso" contains two samples: "Ievan polkka" (2007) by Hatsune Miku (Otomania) which is present in the song's intro and chorus, and "Te Ves Buena" (1990) by El General.

The lyrics of the song were influenced by feminist groups that participated in the Puerto Rican protests and seek to speak in public about consent and the fight against harassment. As Residente said to Rolling Stone in an interview: "It’s about being horny without harassment — it’s consensual. If everybody wants to go all the way, whether you’re a twosome, threesome, or foursome, everybody has to consent."

Music video 
The music video was directed by Gregory Ohrel and it was recorded in San Juan, Puerto Rico. The clip features dancers performing in several beaches and in the streets of San Juan, with Residente and Bad Bunny singing around them. It also shows a cameo of Elías de León from White Lion Records, who Residente has worked previously with. The clip has received more than 180 million views on YouTube, as of July 2021.

Personnel 
Credits adapted from Tidal.

Vocals

 Residente – lead vocals
 Bad Bunny – lead vocals

Musicians

 Trooko – synthesizer

Production

 Residente – production
 Trooko – production, programming
 Tom Elmhirst – mixing
 Phil Joly – recording
 Ted Jensen – mastering
 Oriana Hidalgo – A&R coordination
 Rafa Arcaute – A&R direction

Charts

Certifications

References

External links
 Lyrics of this song at Genius

Residente songs
Bad Bunny songs
2019 songs
2019 singles
Male vocal duets